Potamojanuarius lamellatus is a species of air-breathing land slug, a terrestrial pulmonate gastropod mollusk in the family Veronicellidae, the leatherleaf slugs.

The holotype is kept in Zoological Museum of Kiel University (Zoologisches Museums der Christian-Albrechts-Universität zu Kiel) in Kiel, Germany (lot Mo-1392).

Distribution
The distribution of Potamojanuarius lamellatus includes Brazil.

Ecology 
Potamojanuarius lamellatus was found to represent 50% of the prey of the snail-eating snake Sibynomorphus neuwiedi.

References

Veronicellidae
Gastropods described in 1885